Fooks is a surname. Notable people with the surname include:

Ernest Fooks (1906–1985), Australian architect
Fred Fooks (1880–1958), Australian rules footballer

See also
Chitlin' Fooks
Fookes
Hooks (surname)